Mohammad Asif Kohkan (born 10 June 1936 in Kabul) is a former Afghanistan wrestler, who competed at the 1960 Summer Olympic Games in the middleweight freestyle event.

References

External links
 

Wrestlers at the 1960 Summer Olympics
Afghan male sport wrestlers
Olympic wrestlers of Afghanistan
1936 births
Living people
Wrestlers at the 1962 Asian Games
Asian Games competitors for Afghanistan